Keegan is an Anglicisation of the Irish clan name Mac Aodhagáin. The name means "son (or descendant) of Aodhagán" (a diminutive of the Irish name Aodh, meaning "fire" or "fiery"). In North America the name is most often given to boys, but has gradually become unisex.

Notable people with the surname "Keegan" include

A
Andrew Keegan (born 1979), American actor
Arthur Keegan (1938–2008), English rugby league footballer

B
Betty Ann Keegan (1920–1974), American politician
Bob Keegan (1920–2001), American baseball player
Bob Keegan (actor) (1924–1988), British actor

C
Chad Keegan (born 1979), South African cricketer
Claire Keegan (born 1968), Irish writer
Colm Keegan (born 1989), Irish singer-songwriter

D
Denis Keegan (1924–1993), British judge
Desmond Keegan, Irish academic
Dominic Keegan (born 2000), American baseball player
Donal Keegan (born 1938), Northern Irish physician

E
Earl Keegan Jr. (1921–1977), American politician
Ed Keegan (1939–2014), American baseball player
Eileen Keegan (??–2000), South African ballet dancer

G
Ged Keegan (born 1955), English footballer
George Keegan (1928–2008), Australian politician
Gerry Keegan (born 1994), Irish hurler
Gillian Keegan (born 1968), British politician

H
Harry Keegan (born 1952), Irish Gaelic footballer
Harry A. Keegan (1882–1968), American politician

J
Jake Keegan (born 1991), American soccer player
James Keegan (1869–??), Irish sportsperson
Jimmy Keegan (born 1969), American drummer
Joe Keegan (disambiguation), multiple people
John Keegan (disambiguation), multiple people
Jordan Keegan (born 1992), Irish footballer
Joseph M. Keegan (1922–2007), American politician
Josephine Keegan (born 1935), Scottish composer
Julie Keegan (born 1964), Australian lawn bowler

K
Kashy Keegan (born 1983), British singer-songwriter
Kevin Keegan (born 1951), English footballer
Kevin Keegan (musician) (1924–1978), Irish musician
Kourtney Keegan (born 1994), American tennis player

L
Lee Keegan (born 1989), Irish Gaelic footballer
Lisa Graham Keegan (born 1959), American activist

M
Marina Keegan (1989–2012), American author
Mary Keegan (born 1953), British civil servant
Matt Keegan (born 1976), American artist
Michelle Keegan (born 1987), English actress
Mickey Keegan (born 1986), American professional wrestler

O
Olivia Rose Keegan (born 1999), American actress

P
Paul Keegan (disambiguation), multiple people
Philip Keegan (1942–1988), American politician

R
Ray Keegan (1923–2004), Australian rules footballer
Rita Keegan (born 1949), American artist
Rose Keegan (born 1971), British actress
Rupert Keegan (born 1955), English racing driver

S
Seán Keegan (1930–2007), Irish politician
Shane Keegan (born 1981), Irish football manager
Siobhan Keegan, Northern Irish judge

T
Te Taka Keegan, New Zealand academic
Tim Keegan, English singer-songwriter
Tom Keegan (born 1959), American sportswriter
Tom Keegan (politician) (1878–1937), Australian politician
Trent Keegan (1974–2008), New Zealand photojournalist
Trevor Keegan (born 2000), American football player

V
Victor Keegan (born 1940), British journalist

W
William Keegan (born 1938), British journalist

See also
Keegan (given name), people with the given name "Keegan"
Senator Keegan, a list of Senators with the surname "Keegan"